The phrase "Earth Changes" was coined  by the American psychic Edgar Cayce (1877–1945) to refer to the belief that the world would soon enter on a series of cataclysmic events causing major alterations in human life on the planet.

This includes "natural events" (such as major earthquakes, the melting of the polar ice caps, a pole shift of the planetary axis, major weather events, solar flares and so on) as well as huge changes of the local and global social, economical and political systems.

Cayce
Cayce himself also made many prophecies of cataclysmic events involving the whole planet. He claimed the polar axis would shift and that many areas that are now land would again become ocean floor, and that Atlantis would rise from the sea. The belief that the California coast would slip into the sea—a common feature of Earth Changes predictions—originated with Cayce's alleged prophecies. In more recent times, self-proclaimed psychic Gordon-Michael Scallion has issued a variety of prophecies centering on the concept of "Earth Changes" and publishes a monthly newsletter, The Earth Changes Report.

New Age
Cayce's term has been taken up  in certain segments of the New Age movement, often associated with other predictions by people claiming to have psychic abilities.  These beliefs have occasionally been associated with Christian millennialism and beliefs about UFOs. Some New Age adherents believe that Earth changes will preface a "Golden Age" of spirituality and world peace.

I Am America
In the late 1980s, Lori Toye published the I Am America Map, based on several visions that she claimed to have beginning in 1983. The I Am America Map sold over 40,000 copies, and was followed by subsequent maps: Freedom Star World map, Golden Cities map, and an Earth Changes Progression series of maps.  These maps represented the earth's future geography after climatic earth changes.

Reception and interpretation
Prophecies of Earth changes have been described as a form of pseudoscience, in which terminology and ideas borrowed from science are used to rationalize non-scriptural apocalyptical thought based on visionary experiences. David Spangler, a leader of the Findhorn Foundation spiritual community, described prophecies of Earth changes as an expression of collective fear and anger, rather than as foretelling of actual future events.

See also
 Catastrophism
 Eschatology
 Global catastrophic risk
 Nick Bostrom
 Sea level rise

References

Earth mysteries
Prophecy
All articles with unsourced statements
Environmental sayings
Apocalypticism